Herodorus, also called Herodorus of Heraclea was a native of Heraclea Pontica and wrote a history on Heracles around 400 BC. Plutarch references Herodorus several times in his account of Theseus in Parallel Lives. He should not be confused with Herodotus.

Notes

References
 Smith, William; Dictionary of Greek and Roman Biography and Mythology, London (1873). "Herodo'rus" 

Ancient Greek mythographers
Ancient Greek historians known only from secondary sources